Herrania laciniifolia is a species of flowering plant in the family Malvaceae. It is found only in Colombia.

References

laciniifolia
Endemic flora of Colombia
Taxonomy articles created by Polbot

Least concern plants